Elechi Amadi   (12 May 1934 – 29 June 2016) was a Nigerian author and soldier. He was a former member of the Nigerian Armed Forces. He was an author of plays and novels that are generally about African village life, customs, beliefs, and religious practices prior to contact with the Western world. Amadi is best regarded for his 1966 debut novel, The Concubine, which has been called "an outstanding work of pure fiction".

Early life and education
Born in 1934, in Mbodo-Aluu in what is now the Ikwerre local government area of Rivers State, Nigeria, Elechi Amadi attended Government College, Umuahia (1948–52), Survey School, Oyo (1953–54), and the University of Ibadan (1955–59), where he obtained a degree in Physics and Mathematics. While in university, he adopted the name Elechi Amadi, which he felt reflected his Ikwerre heritage more than his birth name, Emmanuel Elechi Daniel.

Career
He worked for a time as a land surveyor and later was a teacher at several schools, including the Nigerian Military School, Zaria (1963–66).

Military service and politics 
Amadi served in the Nigerian army, remained there during the Nigerian Civil War, and retired at the rank of captain. He then held various positions with the Rivers State government: Permanent Secretary (1973–83), Commissioner for Education (1987–88) and Commissioner for Lands and Housing (1989–90).

Writing 
He was a writer-in-residence and lecturer at Rivers State College of Education, where he has also been Dean of Arts, head of the literature department and Director of General Studies.

Amadi has said that his first publication was in 1957, a poem entitled "Penitence" in a University of Ibadan campus magazine called The Horn, edited by John Pepper Clark.

Amadi's first novel, The Concubine, was published in London in 1966 and was hailed as a "most accomplished first performance". Alastair Niven in his critical study of the novel wrote: "Rooted firmly among the hunting and fishing villages of the Niger delta, The Concubine nevertheless possesses the timelessness and universality of a major novel." The Concubine was made into a film, written by Elechi Amadi and directed by accomplished Nollywood film director Andy Amenechi, which premiered in Abuja in March 2007.

The setting of Amadi's second novel, The Great Ponds, published in 1969, is pre-colonial Eastern Nigeria, and is about the battle between two village communities over possession of a pond.

In 1973 Amadi autobiographical non-fiction, Sunset in Biafra, was published. It records his personal experiences in the Nigeria-Biafra war, and according to Niven "is written in a compelling narrative form as though it were a novel".

On 13 May 1989 a symposium was held at the University of Port Harcourt to celebrate Amadi's 55th birthday.

In May 2004, a conference was organized by the Association of Nigerian Authors, Rivers State Branch, to mark Elechi Amadi's 70th birthday.

For his last book, When God Came, Elechi turned for the first time to the genre of science fiction. Reviewing it, Lindsay Barrett wrote: "When an author has attained the status of an icon in his profession, based on the publication of works that have been declared iconic masterpieces from the earliest period of his career, it is unusual to find him engaging in experimentation in the latter stages of that career. This is the surprising trajectory that this short but profoundly memorable booklet by the late Elechi Amadi represents. Although the two narrative treatises contained in this work were described by the author as an excursion into the medium of science fiction it would really be more accurate to define them as philosophical allegories. Their contents contemplate the human condition and the limits of the potential for human achievement based on the concept of the supernatural rather than simply being exercises in the conceptualisation of events of an otherworldly nature, which popular science fiction often is. ...  In the final analysis these works read like fables from the future that the author must have had immense enjoyment creating.
Amadi’s love for literature and his prolific output in his early years overshadowed his scientific background especially after the Civil War when he settled down to work as an educationist and public administrator in Rivers State. It was in this period that he embarked on the experiments in new forms of writing of which this work is a slight but unforgettable example."

Later years

2009 kidnapping 
On 5 January 2009 Amadi was kidnapped at his home in Aluu town, Ikwerre, by unknown gunmen. He was released on the evening of 6 January, 23 hours later.

Africa39 
In 2014 he was a judge of Africa39, together with Tess Onwueme and Margaret Busby.

Death 
On 29 June 2016, Amadi died at the Good Heart Hospital in Port Harcourt at the age of 82. Nobel laureate Wole Soyinka paid tribute to Amadi as "a soldier and poet, captive of conscience, human solidarity and justice."

Awards 
 1992 – Rivers State Silver Jubilee Merit Award.
 2003 – honorary doctorate, Doctor of Science (D.Sc.) in Education, honoris causa, awarded by Rivers State University of Science and Technology.
 2003 – Fellow of the Nigerian Academy of Education.
 2003 – Member of the Order of the Federal Republic (MFR).

Legacy 
The Faculty of Humanity in University of Port Harcourt, is dedicated to him. Port Harcourt Polytechnic was renamed to Captain Elechi Amadi Polytechnic in 2016.

Bibliography 
 The Concubine (novel), London: Heinemann African Writers Series, 1969; Ibadan: Heinemann Books, 1993, 
 The Great Ponds (novel), Heinemann, 1969; Macmillan Education, 1976, 
 Sunset in Biafra (war diary), Heinemann African Writers Series, 1969, 
 Isiburu (play), Heinemann, 1973, 
 Peppersoup and The Road (plays, combined volume), Ibadan: Onibonoje Publishers, 1977
 Dancer of Johannesburg (play), Ibadan: Onibonoje Publishers, 1978
 The Slave (novel), Heinemann African Writers Series, 1978, 
 Ethics in Nigerian Culture (philosophy), London: Heinemann Educational Books, 1982, 
 Estrangement (novel), Heinemann African Writers Series, 1986, 
 The Woman of Calabar (play), Port Harcourt: Gitelle Press, 2002
 Speaking and Singing (essays and poems), University of Port Harcourt Press, 2003
 Collected Plays (ed. Seiyifa Koroye), Port Harcourt: Pearl Publishers, 2004
 When God Came, 2011

Further reading 
 Ebele Eko, Elechi Amadi: The Man and his Work, Yaba, Lagos: Kraft Books Ltd, 1991.
 Willfried Feuser and Ebele Eko (eds), Elechi Amadi at 55, Ibadan: Heinemann Educational Books, 1994.
 Seiyifa Koroye, Critical Perspectives on Elechi Amadi, Port Harcourt: Pearl Publishers/Association of Nigerian Authors, 2008.

References

External links 
 Elechi Amadi official website
 "Conversation with Elechi Amadi: When I wrote The Concubine, I thought it was a joke", The Sun (Nigeria), 16 July 2016.
 Wole Soyinka, "Elechi Amadi, a tribute", The News, 4 July 2016.

1934 births
2016 deaths
Nigerian male novelists
University of Ibadan alumni
Writers from Rivers State
Members of the Order of the Federal Republic
20th-century Nigerian novelists
21st-century Nigerian novelists
Ikwerre people
Rivers State Commissioners of Education
People of Rivers State in the Nigerian Civil War
Military personnel of the Nigerian Civil War
International Writing Program alumni
Educators from Rivers State
20th-century male writers
21st-century male writers
Government College Umuahia alumni